The 2006 Beach Handball World Championships are a ten-team tournament in both men's and women's beach handball, held in the Petrobras Arena at Copacabana beach in Rio de Janeiro, Brazil between 15 November and 19 November. This is the second edition of the event. Matches are played in sets, the team that wins two sets is the winner of a match. When teams are equal in points the head-to-head result is decisive. Brazil win the championship gold medal in both genders.

Men

Group A

November 15, 2006

November 16, 2006

November 17, 2006

Group B

November 15, 2006

November 16, 2006

November 17, 2006

Quarter finals

November 17, 2006

9th / 10th position

November 18, 2006

5th to 8th position

November 18, 2006

7th / 8th position

November 18, 2006

5th / 6th position

November 18, 2006

Semi finals

November 18, 2006

3rd / 4th position

November 19, 2006

Final

November 19, 2006

Awards
Topscorer
 

All-star team

Women

Group A

November 15, 2006

November 16, 2006

November 17, 2006

Group B

November 15, 2006

November 16, 2006

November 17, 2006

Quarter finals

November 17, 2006

9th / 10th position

November 18, 2006

5th to 8th position

November 18, 2006

7th / 8th position

November 18, 2006

5th / 6th position

November 18, 2006

Semi finals

November 18, 2006

3rd / 4th position

November 19, 2006

Final

November 19, 2006

Awards
Topscorer
 

All-star team

References

External links
Official website
Beach Handball - Balonmano playa magazine
European Beach Handball community
Beach Handball - Videos, Rules, Wiki

Beach Handball World Championships
Beach Handball World Championships
International sports competitions in Rio de Janeiro (city)
2006 in Brazilian sport
Beach
November 2006 sports events in South America